Strangers Helping Strangers is a non-profit organization of music fans dedicated to holding food drives at concerts throughout the nation, benefiting those in need in each community an event is held.

The origins of Strangers Helping Strangers (SHS) dates back to late 1997, when two fans of the Burlington, Vermont-based band Strangefolk, Kat Antonioli and Tina Kelleher, saw an opportunity to help the homeless by collecting non-perishable food at various Strangefolk concerts throughout the Northeast USA and donating it to food banks and charities in the cities and towns where Strangefolk played.   

The first official food drive was held at Strangefolk's concert at the State Theater in Portland, ME in February of 1998. Leveraging the band's engaged online fanbase to help spread the word, as well as collecting contact information for their own newsletter via a sign up sheet at each show, awareness about SHS began to grow within the community of northeast fans who followed Strangefolk. In 2000, Jambands.com (the online component of Relix Magazine) held their first annual Jammy Awards at Irving Plaza in New York City, where SHS was awarded the first ever Jammy Award for Community Service.  and since then, SHS has collected items for charities all over the country.  In addition to working closely with Strangefolk, SHS has expanded over the years to work with hundreds other bands such as the Assembly of Dust, Dark Star Orchestra, moe., Max Creek, Zen Tricksters, Scarecrow Collection, U-Melt, Rev Tor Band, Roots of Creation and many more.  SHS offers incentives and prizes to those who donate at their events, including live CD’s, merchandise, tickets to future concerts and much more.

SHS began with a volunteer group of five individuals and has grown to its current level.  Today, SHS has a volunteer core of nearly thirty official volunteers (including the Board of Directors), in addition to many friends and family members who help the organization in multiple ways.

External links
Strangers Helping Strangers - Official Website

Jammy Award winners